Three ships of the Royal Navy have been named HMS Cottesmore after the Cottesmore hunt:

 The first , launched in 1917, was a  minesweeper. She served in World War I and was paid off and sold in 1919.
She served in World War II, was sold to the Egyptian Navy in 1950 being renamed Port Said, and served into the 1980s as a training ship.
 The third , launched in 1982 and decommissioned in 2005, was a mine countermeasures vessel of another . Prince Andrew, Duke of York commanded HMS Cottesmore from April 1993 until November 1994.

External links 
 

Royal Navy ship names